Lola Fani-Kayode is a Nigerian television producer known for the creation of Mirror in the Sun and Mind-Bending, an educative and information television program about the dangers of drug addiction starring Joke Silva and Akin Lewis. She is a cousin of Femi Fani-Kayode.

Filmography 

 Mirror in the Sun
 Mind Bending

References

Nigerian television producers
Fani-Kayode family
Nigerian film producers